Prince Abdullah al-Faisal Stadium is a stadium in the port city of Jeddah, Saudi Arabia.

The stadium is located in the south east of Jeddah, between King Abdulaziz University and the industrial city (Al Waziriah District). It is bound in the east by the Jeddah-Makkah expressway and in the south, Stadium street.

The stadium was constructed in 1970, and has a capacity of around 27,000 spectators, and is part of a municipal sports complex that includes an indoor arena and an aquatics center.

The stadium consists of two main stands. The covered west stand, is fully seated and has an enclosed VIP box and media suites in a central tribune. The arch shaped east stand is terraced, and curves along the running track. A single large scoreboard is located on the northern edge of the east stand.

It is only now that the whole stadium will be seated. The exercise will reduce the capacity to 20,000 spectators and it is projected that it would be done by the end of year 2009.

Al-Ittihad and Al-Ahli Saudi FC both used the venue for home games.

References

External links
 Location map
 Stadium picture
 Video Teaser of the King Abdullah Sports City Grand Opening
 StadiumDB images

1970 establishments in Saudi Arabia
Football venues in Saudi Arabia
Buildings and structures in Jeddah